The 1960 National Challenge Cup was the 47th edition of the USSFA's annual open soccer championship.  The Philadelphia Ukrainians defeated the Los Angeles Kickers to win.

Final

References
 

Lamar Hunt U.S. Open Cup
U.S. Open Cup